
This is a list of players who graduated from the Challenge Tour in 2013. The top 15 players on the Challenge Tour's money list in 2013 earned their European Tour card for 2014.

* European Tour rookie in 2014
T = Tied 
 The player retained his European Tour card for 2016 (finished inside the top 110).
 The player did not retain his European Tour card for 2016, but retained conditional status (finished between 111–147).
 The player did not retain his European Tour card for 2015 (finished outside the top 147).

Koepka earned a direct promotion to the European Tour after his third win of the season in June. Pavan and Otaegui regained their cards for 2015 through Q School.

Winners on the European Tour in 2014

Runners-up on the European Tour in 2014

See also
2013 European Tour Qualifying School graduates

External links 
Final ranking for 2013

Challenge Tour
European Tour
Challenge Tour Graduates
Challenge Tour Graduates